Éric Fabián Ramos (born 12 May 1987) is a Paraguayan international footballer who plays for Sabah FK, as a central midfielder.

Career

Club career
Born in Carapeguá, Ramos has played club football in Paraguay and Azerbaijan for 12 de Octubre, 3 de Febrero, Rubio Ñu and Neftchi Baku.

In the summer of 2012 Ramos signed a one-year loan deal with Neftchi Baku of the Azerbaijan Premier League. In his first season with the club he won both the Azerbaijan Premier League and the Azerbaijan Cup. At the end of the 2012-13 season, Ramos returned to Rubio Ñu after the two clubs could not agree a deal to make the move permanent.
İn June 2014, Ramos paid his transfer fee to Rubio Nu and transferred to Neftchi PFC as a permanent player. Following the 2015–16 Cup Final, Ramos announced that he would be leaving Neftchi.

In July 2018, Ramos returned to Azerbaijan, signing for Sabah FK.

International career
Ramos made his international debut for Paraguay in 2012.

Career statistics

Honours
Neftchi Baku
Azerbaijan Premier League: 2012–13
Azerbaijan Cup: 2012–13,

Notes

References

1987 births
Living people
Paraguayan footballers
Paraguay international footballers
People from Carapeguá
12 de Octubre Football Club players
Club Atlético 3 de Febrero players
Club Rubio Ñu footballers
Neftçi PFK players
Sabah FC (Azerbaijan) players
Paraguayan Primera División players
Azerbaijan Premier League players
Paraguayan expatriate footballers
Expatriate footballers in Azerbaijan
Paraguayan expatriate sportspeople in Azerbaijan
Association football midfielders